Liga Deportiva Universitaria de Quito's 2022 season was the club's 92nd year of existence, the 69th year in professional football, and the 61st in the top level of professional football in Ecuador.

Club

Personnel
President: Guillermo Romero
President of the Executive Commission: Esteban Paz
Sporting manager: Santiago Jácome

Coaching staff
Manager: Luis Zubeldía
Assistant manager: Maximiliano Cuberas, Carlos Gruezo
Physical trainer: Lucas Vivas
Goalkeeper trainer: Luis Preti

Kits
Supplier: Puma
Sponsor(s): Banco Pichincha, Mazda, Universidad Indoamérica, Discover, Pilsener, Ecuabet, Salud SA

Squad information

Note: Caps and goals are of the national league and are current as of the beginning of the season.

Winter transfers

Summer transfers

Competitions

Pre-season friendlies

LigaPro

The 2022 season was Liga's 61st season in the Serie A and their 21st consecutive.

First stage

Results summary

Results by round

Second stage

Results summary

Results by round

CONMEBOL Sudamericana

L.D.U. Quito qualified to the 2022 CONMEBOL Sudamericana—their 13rd participation in the continental tournament—as 6th place in the 2021 LigaPro. They entered the competition in the First Stage.

CONMEBOL Sudamericana squad

First stage

Group stage

Copa Ecuador

L.D.U. Quito entered the competition in the Round of 32.

Round of 32

Round of 16

Player statistics

Note: Players in italics left the club mid-season.

Team statistics

References

External links
  

2022
2022 in Ecuadorian football